Cristina Umaña (born December 24, 1974) is a Colombian actress.

She studied drama from 1993 to 1995 in the Centro de Educación Artística of Televisa. In Colombia she had the leading role of telenovelas, Yo amo a Paquita Gallego and La mujer del presidente. She is best known for playing the role of Judy Moncada in the Netflix series Narcos, and Gloria Bonalde in the Amazon series Jack Ryan, (2019) .

Filmography
 Lecciones para un Beso, 2011
 Dios los Junta y Ellos se Separan, 2006
 El Rey, 2004
 El Capo 2, 2010
 ¿Quién Paga el Pato?, 2000
 Mira Quien te Mira, 1999
 Malamor, 1999

 Television 
 Jack Ryan, 2019, Gloria Bonalde
 Wild District Daniela Leon, 2018
 Narcos, 2015, Judy Moncada
 , 2008
 La Dama de Troya, 2008
 Capadocia, 2008
 Tiempo Final, 2007
 Vuelo 1503, 2005
 Todos Quieren con Marilyn, 2004
 Punto de Giro, 2003
 Siete Veces Amada, 2002
 Traga Maluca, 2000
 Amores Como el Nuestro, 1998
 La Mujer del Presidente, 1997
 Yo amo a Paquita Gallego, 1997
 Cartas a Harrison, 1996
 Mascarada, 1996
 Oro, 1996
 El Capo, 2009
 El Rey de los Cielos'', 2011

Awards 
 Premios TvyNovelas - Best Antagonistic Actress, 2005
 Premios TvyNovelas - Best Actress, 1999
 Premios TvyNovelas - Best Actress in a Supporting role, 1999
 Festival Internacional de Cine de Cartagena,  1998
 Premios Shocks- Best NewActress, 1998

References

External links
 
  www.CristinaUmana.org

1974 births
Living people
People from Ibagué
Colombian actresses
Colombian telenovela actresses